Anecdotal evidence is evidence based only on personal observation, collected in a casual or non-systematic manner. The term is sometimes used in a legal context to describe certain kinds of testimony which are uncorroborated by objective, independent evidence such as notarized documentation, photographs, audio-visual recordings, etc.

When used in advertising or promotion of a product, service, or idea, anecdotal reports are often called a testimonial, which are highly regulated in some jurisdictions.

When compared to other types of evidence, anecdotal evidence is generally regarded as limited in value due to a number of potential weaknesses, but may be considered within the scope of scientific method as some anecdotal evidence can be both empirical and verifiable, e.g. in the use of case studies in medicine. Other anecdotal evidence, however, does not qualify as scientific evidence, because its nature prevents it from being investigated by the scientific method. Where only one or a few anecdotes are presented, there is a larger chance that they may be unreliable due to cherry-picked or otherwise non-representative samples of typical cases. Similarly, psychologists have found that due to cognitive bias people are more likely to remember notable or unusual examples rather than typical examples. Thus, even when accurate, anecdotal evidence is not necessarily representative of a typical experience. Accurate determination of whether an anecdote is typical requires statistical evidence. Misuse of anecdotal evidence in the form of argument from anecdote is an informal fallacy and is sometimes referred to as the "person who" fallacy ("I know a person who..."; "I know of a case where..." etc.) which places undue weight on experiences of close peers which may not be typical.

In all forms of anecdotal evidence its reliability by objective independent assessment may be in doubt. This is a consequence of the informal way the information is gathered, documented, presented, or any combination of the three. The term is often used to describe evidence for which there is an absence of documentation, leaving verification dependent on the credibility of the party presenting the evidence.

Scientific context 

In science, definitions of anecdotal evidence include:

 "casual observations or indications rather than rigorous or scientific analysis"
 "information passed along by word-of-mouth but not documented scientifically"
"evidence that comes from an individual experience. This may be the experience of a person with an illness or the experience of a practitioner based on one or more patients outside a formal research study."
"the report of an experience by one or more persons that is not objectively documented or an experience or outcome that occurred outside of a controlled environment"

Anecdotal evidence can have varying degrees of formality. For instance, in medicine, published anecdotal evidence by a trained observer (a doctor) is called a case report, and is subjected to formal peer review. Although such evidence is not seen as conclusive, researchers may sometimes regard it as an invitation to more rigorous scientific study of the phenomenon in question. For instance, one study found that 35 of 47 anecdotal reports of drug side-effects were later sustained as "clearly correct."

Anecdotal evidence is considered the least certain type of scientific information. Researchers may use anecdotal evidence for suggesting new hypotheses, but never as validating evidence.

Anecdotal evidence is often unscientific or pseudoscientific because various forms of cognitive bias may affect the collection or presentation of evidence. For instance, someone who claims to have had an encounter with a supernatural being or alien may present a very vivid story, but this is not falsifiable. This phenomenon can also happen to large groups of people through subjective validation.

Anecdotal evidence is also frequently misinterpreted via the availability heuristic, which leads to an overestimation of prevalence. Where a cause can be easily linked to an effect, people overestimate the likelihood of the cause having that effect (availability). In particular, vivid, emotionally charged anecdotes seem more plausible and are given greater weight. A related issue is that it is usually impossible to assess every piece of anecdotal evidence, and the rate of people not reporting that anecdotal evidence in the population.

A common way anecdotal evidence becomes unscientific is through fallacious reasoning such as the post hoc ergo propter hoc fallacy, the human tendency to assume that if one event happens after another, then the first must be the cause of the second. Another fallacy involves inductive reasoning. For instance, if an anecdote illustrates a desired conclusion rather than a logical conclusion, it is considered a faulty or hasty generalization. For example, here is anecdotal evidence presented as proof of a desired conclusion:

Anecdotes like this do not prove anything. In any case where some factor affects the probability of an outcome, rather than uniquely determining it, selected individual cases to prove nothing; e.g. "my grandfather smoked two packs a day until he died at 90" and "my sister never smoked but died of lung cancer". Anecdotes often refer to the exception, rather than the rule: "Anecdotes are useless precisely because they may point to idiosyncratic responses."

More generally, a statistical correlation between things does not in itself prove that one causes the other (a causal link). A study found that television viewing was strongly correlated with sugar consumption, but this does not prove that viewing causes sugar intake (or vice versa).

In medicine, anecdotal evidence is also subject to placebo effects: it is well-established that a patient's (or doctor's) expectation can genuinely change the outcome of treatment. Only double-blind randomized placebo-controlled clinical trials can confirm a hypothesis about the effectiveness of treatment independently of expectations.

By contrast, in science and logic, the "relative strength of an explanation" is based upon its ability to be:

 tested or repeated
 proven to be due to the stated cause, and
 verifiable under neutral conditions in a manner that other researchers will agree has been performed competently, and can check for themselves

n≠(me)

This formula of n≠(me), was proposed by the Department of Critical Thinking at Hygia Institute of Pharmaceutical Education & Research, Lucknow, Uttar Pradesh, India. Where (n) is the sample size and (me) is your opinion or opinion of a small group of persons. It simply means that the sample size of any clinical evidence can not be your testimony alone or based on a small sample size. If someone says that a particular medicine (alternative or untested) worked on them, it should not mean that it will also work on everyone else. This formula [ n≠(me) ] is particularly important for general population who does not have a general understanding/expertise in medicine.

Law

Witness testimony is a common form of evidence in law, and the law has mechanisms to test witness evidence for reliability or credibility. Legal processes for the taking and assessment of evidence are formalized. Some witness testimony may be described as anecdotal evidence, such as individual stories of harassment as part of a class action lawsuit. However, witness testimony can be tested and assessed for reliability. Examples of approaches to testing and assessment include the use of questioning to identify possible gaps or inconsistencies, evidence of corroborating witnesses, documents, video, and forensic evidence. Where a court lacks suitable means to test and assess the testimony of a particular witness, such as the absence of forms of corroboration or substantiation, it may afford that testimony limited or no "weight" when making a decision on the facts.

Scientific evidence as legal evidence

In certain situations, scientific evidence presented in court must also meet the legal requirements for evidence. For instance, in the United States, the expert testimony of witnesses must meet the Daubert standard. This ruling holds that before evidence is presented to witnesses by experts, the methodology must be "generally accepted" among scientists. In some situations, anecdotal evidence may meet this threshold (such as certain case reports which corroborate or refute other evidence).

Altman and Bland argue that the case report or statistical outlier cannot be dismissed as having no weight: "With rare and uncommonly occurring diseases, a nonsignificant finding in a randomized trial does not necessarily mean that there is no causal association between the agent in question and the disease."

See also

References

Informal fallacies
Philosophy of science
Skepticism
Evidence
Testimony
Inductive fallacies
Diversionary tactics
Misuse of statistics